Chandrajit may refer to

Chandrajit Bajaj, computer professional
Chandrajit Banerjee, director general of  CII 
Chandrajit Yadav, Indian politician

Indian masculine given names